Santa Margalida is a municipality with a population of 10,204 located in the northeast of the Spanish Balearic Island Majorca.

The residents are divided over three settlement areas, the principal one being Santa Margalida, 10 km inland from the coast. The other areas are primarily Tourist resorts, Can Picafort and Son Serra de Marina on the coast at the bay of Alcúdia.

The non-national population stands at 23.6% (2,413).

Geography

Geographical location 
The municipality of Santa Margalida lies about 45 Kilometres from the islands capital Palma. It is part of the region (Comarca) Plà de Mallorca or Es Plà, the great central plain of the island.

The municipality is one of the flattest on Majorca at very little more than 100 metres above sea level. The area is drained by a few streams which flow towards the sea in the north east. In the north west, Santa Margalida is bordered by a fresh water swamp. Along the north eastern coast there are obelisks at regular intervals of 1,250m. These, along with corresponding twin towers 200 metres inland, were used in the 19th century as navigational points of reference for seafarers.

Neighbouring municipalities 
In the north west Santa Margalida is bordered by Muro and Llubí. Both of which, belong to Es Plà, along with Maria de la Salut, Ariany and Petra to the south. In the east the Torrent de na Borges- the longest stream in Mallorca- forms the border to Artà in the Llevant region.

Community arrangement 

The municipality of Santa Margalida has three towns. The population figures follow date from 1 January 2005 and don't include the population outside these settlements, hence the sum of the figures does not add up to the total population of the municipality (Source: INE).
 Can Picafort (5,685 Inhabitants)
 Santa Margalida (3,195 Inhabitants)
 Son Serra de Marina (535 Inhabitants)

Santa Margalida 
There is a long tradition of agriculture and handicrafts in the region.

The historically proven founding of a municipality took place soon after the Reconquista. Old inscriptions and tombstones bear witness though of the place being inhabited already in Roman times, then called Hero. Later, during the Arab reign, the great estate of Abenmaaxbar was located here. The location itself and St. Margalida are the topics of many myths and tales which eventually the municipalities namesake.

Testament to the wealth is the large parish church of Santa Margalida, this was built in 1232 and renovated in the 17th or 18th century. From the church there is a good view over the countryside. The inside the church is well fitted out.

Can Picafort 
Can Picafort (or Ca'n Picafort) is a tourist resort on the Bay of Alcúdia. Between the Port d'Alcudia in the north of the bay and Can Picafort, there is a five kilometre long sandy beach lined with hotels. The protected Albufera swamp borders about 2 kilometers of the bay and prevents the two tourist resorts from joining. The 8 square kilometre wilderness is a good alternative to the tourist resorts and can be explored by renting bikes.

Can Picafort is well set up for tourism and the beach's promenade offers many Bars and Restaurants. One can shop by day and stroll the pedestrian area in the evening.

Can Picafort isn't just popular during peak season. Off-peak is however considerably quieter and many of the businesses close. Already in the 1990s the population here exceeded that of the main town Santa Margalida and the town has become an important residence. Major items of infrastructure can also be found here. From the neighbourhood of Son Bauló one can reach the necropoles of Son Real, and situated on a nearby island, S'Illa d'en Porros. Both are the remains of the Talaiot culture from the early history of Majorca. From there a shore hiking path leads to Son Serra de Marina.

Water sports  
The Bay of Alcudia offers some of the best sailing conditions in the Mediterranean. With the exception of just a handful of days along the season, the wind caused by the sun heating the earth's surface in the interior of the Island is a stable ten to fifteen knots onshore push that delivers small waves and just the right amount of freshness. This wind starts around 10 am and goes strong until right after 5 pm. When storms from the North hit the bay, the most experienced sailors can fight the elements in the relative safety of the Bay, but waves can reach up to twelve feet high.

Motor sport 
In Can Picafort there is one of the largest cart racing tracks in Majorca. After a restructuring in 2004 the track features a length of 1325m in total. It is divided into two courses, with 725m acting as a professional race course and 825m for cart rentals. Every year an international 24 hour race takes places alongside several national races.

Son Serra de Marina 
This tourist resort 6 kilometers south of Can Picafort extends for about 1,400 meters along the Bay of Alcúdia. It is built exclusively of two-storied houses, most of which have been constructed as secondary residences for locals. Streetlife there is accordingly quiet. Only during the holiday seasons will the owners come here from Palma or the mainland. In contrast to Can Picafort mass tourism has not yet reached this place.

Son Serra de Marina features a small marina on its western beach. In the east the town is limited by the Torrent de na Borges. The beach there is a resort for wind and kite surfers.

The town has three moderately frequented beaches. The local one west of the Torrent de na Borges, approximately 450 meters long and 130 meters wide, is mostly visited by local residents. East of the town lies the 1,800 meter-long beach of Sa Canova, which belongs to the Artà municipality and almost extends to Colonia de Sant Pere's neighbourhood of S'Estanyol. To the west, slightly offside the settlement is the beach of Son Real. A hiking trail along the coast leads to Can Picafort.

Culture and sightseeing

Churches 
 Parish Church Santa Margalida

Building sites 
 Necropoles of Son Real and S'Illa d'en Porros (Talaiot culture)

Nature 
 Parc natural de s'Albufera de Mallorca bird sanctuary

Beaches 

Beaches and bays in the municipality of Santa Margalida include Platja de Can Picafort, Platja de son Bauló, s'Arenal d'en Casat, Cala Serralot, Platja de son Real, Platja de es Dolç and Platja de son Serra de Marina.

Festivals 
 Festes de Santa Margalida, feast of the Patron Saint around 20 July
 Festes de la Beata in honor of Santa Catalina Tomàs, 1st Sunday in September

Notable people 
Juan March (1880–1962), banker - founder of Banca March

References

External links 

 Official website 
 Informació de l'Institut d'Estadística de les Illes Balears 
 Beaches in the municipality 

Municipalities in Mallorca
Populated places in Mallorca